Ampasina Maningory is a rural municipality in Madagascar, located along the Maningory River, a few kilometers from the Indian Ocean.  It belongs to the district of Fenerive Est, which is a part of Analanjirofo Region. The population of the commune was estimated to be approximately 36,000 in 2001 commune census.

Primary and junior level secondary education are available in town. The majority 95% of the population of the commune are farmers.  The most important crop is cloves, while other important products are coffee and rice.  Services provide employment for 2% of the population. Additionally fishing employs 3% of the population.

Rivers
 The Maningory River crosses Ampasina Maningory and flows into the Indian Ocean at  East of the town.

Roads
The National road No. 5 goes through Ampasina Maningory.

References 

Populated places in Analanjirofo